High-entropy oxides (HEOs) are complex oxides that contain five or more principal metal cations and have a single-phase crystal structure. The first HEO, (MgNiCuCoZn)0.2O in a rock salt structure, was reported in 2015 by Rost et al. HEOs have been successfully synthesized in many structures, including fluorites, perovskites, and spinels. HEOs are currently being investigated for applications as functional materials.

History 
In the realm of high-entropy materials, HEOs are preceded by high-entropy alloys (HEAs), which were first reported by Yeh et al. in 2004. HEAs are alloys of five or more principal metallic elements. Some HEAs have been shown to possess desirable mechanical properties, such as retaining strength/hardness at high temperatures. HEA research substantially accelerated in the 2010s.

The first HEO, (MgNiCuCoZn)0.2O in a rock salt structure, was reported in 2015 by Rost et al. Similar to HEAs, (MgNiCuCoZn)0.2O is a multicomponent single-phase material. The cation site in (MgNiCuCoZn)0.2O material is compositionally disordered, similar to HEAs. However, unlike HEAs, (MgNiCuCoZn)0.2O contains an ordered anion sublattice. Following the discovery of HEOs in 2015, the field rapidly expanded.

Since the discovery of HEOs, the field of high-entropy materials has expanded to include high-entropy metal diborides, high-entropy carbides, high-entropy sulfides, and high-entropy alumino-silicides.

Predicting HEO Formation

Principle of Entropy Stabilization 
The formation of HEOs is based on the principle of entropy stabilization. Thermodynamics predicts that the structure which minimizes Gibbs free energy for a given temperature and pressure will form. The formula for Gibbs free energy is given by:

where G is Gibbs free energy, H is enthalpy, T is absolute temperature, and S is entropy. It can clearly be seen from this formula that a large entropy reduces Gibbs free energy and thus favors phase stability. It can also be seen that entropy becomes increasingly important in determining phase stability at higher temperatures. In a multi-component system, one component of entropy is the entropy of mixing. For an ideal mixture,  takes the form:

where R is the ideal gas constant, n is the number of components, and ci is the atomic fraction of component i. The value of  increases as the number of components increases. For a given number of components,  is maximized when the atomic fractions of the components approach equimolar amounts.

Evidence for entropy stabilization is given by the original rock salt HEO (MgNiCuCoZn)0.2O. Single-phase (MgNiCuCoZn)0.2O may be prepared by solid-state reaction of CuO, CoO, NiO, MgO, and ZnO. Rost et al. reported that under solid state reaction conditions that produce single-phase (MgNiCuCoZn)0.2O, the absence of any one of the five oxide precursors will result in a multi-phase sample, suggesting that configurational entropy stabilizes the material.

Other Considerations 
It can clearly be seen from the formula for Gibbs free energy that enthalpy reduction is another important indicator of phase stability. For an HEO to form, the enthalpy of formation must be sufficiently small to be overcome by configurational entropy. Furthermore, the discussion above assumes that the reaction kinetics allow for the thermodynamically favored phase to form.

Synthesis Methods

Solid-State Reaction 
Bulk samples of HEOs may be prepared by the solid-state reaction method. In this technique, oxide precursors are ball milled and pressed into a green body, which is sintered at a high temperature. The thermal energy provided accelerates diffusion within the green body, allowing new phases to form within the sample. Solid-state reactions are often carried out in the presence of air to allow oxygen-rich and oxygen-deficient mixtures to release and absorb oxygen from the atmosphere, respectively. Oxide precursors are not required to have the same crystal structure as the desired HEO for the solid-state reaction method to be effective. For example, CuO and ZnO may be used as precursors to synthesize (MgNiCuCoZn)0.2O. At room temperature, CuO has the tenorite structure and ZnO has the wurtzite structure.

Polymeric Steric Entrapment 
Polymeric steric entrapment is a wet chemistry technique for synthesizing oxides. It is based on similar principles as the sol–gel process, which has also been used to synthesize HEOs. Polymeric steric entrapment requires water-soluble compounds containing the desired metal cation (e.g., metal acetates, metal chlorides) to be placed in a solution with water and a water-soluble polymer (e.g., PVA, PEG). In solution, the cations are thoroughly mixed and held close together by the polymer chains. The water is driven off to produce a foam whose organic components are burned off with a calcining step, producing a fine and pure mixed oxide powder, which may be pressed into a green body and sintered. This method was first reported by Nguyen et al. in 2011. In 2017, Kriven and Tseng reported the first polymeric steric entrapment HEO synthesis.

Polymeric steric entrapment can be used to synthesize bulk HEO samples that are difficult to successfully synthesize the solid-state method. For example, Musico et al. synthesized the high entropy cuprate (LaNdGdTbDy)0.4CuO4 using solid-state reaction and polymeric steric entrapment. X-ray diffraction of the sample prepared with solid-state reaction showed small inclusions of a second phase, and energy-dispersive X-ray spectroscopy showed inhomogeneous distributions of some cations. Neither impurity peaks nor evidence of inhomogeneous cation distribution was found in the sample of this material prepared with polymeric steric entrapment.

Other Techniques 
Other techniques that have been used to synthesize HEOs include:

 Nebulized spray pyrolysis
 Pulsed laser deposition
 Magnetron sputtering
 Sol-gel method
 Anodizing HEA precursors
 Hot pressing

HEO Materials 
The first HEOs synthesized had the rock-salt structure. Since then, the family of HEOs has expanded to include perovskite, spinel, fluorite, and other structures. Some of these structures, such as the perovskite structure, are notable in that they have two cation sites, each of which may independently possess compositional disorder. For example, high entropy perovskites (GdLaNdSmY)0.2MnO3 (A-site configurational entropy), Gd(CoCrFeMnNi)0.2O3 (B-site configurational entropy), and (GdLaNdSmY)0.2(CoCrFeMnNi)0.2O3 (A-site and B-site configurational entropy) have been synthesized.

Properties and Applications 
In contrast to HEAs, which are typically investigated for their mechanical properties, HEOs are often studied as functional materials. The original HEO, (MgNiCuCoZn)0.2O, has been investigated as a promising material for applications in energy production and storage, e.g. as anode material in Li-ion batteries, or as large k dielectric material, or in catalysis.

Low Thermal Conductivity 
It has been shown that increasing the configurational entropy of a material reduces its lattice thermal conductivity. Correspondingly, HEOs typically have lower thermal conductivities than materials with the same crystal structure and only one cation per lattice site. The thermal conductivity of HEOs is usually greater than or comparable to the thermal conductivity of amorphous materials containing the same components. However, crystalline materials typically have higher elastic moduli than amorphous materials of the same components. The combination of these factors leads to HEOs occupying a unique region of the property space by having the highest elastic modulus to thermal conductivity ratios of all materials.

Property Tunability Through Cation Selection 
HEOs enhance functional property tunability through cation selection. Magnetic, catalytic, and thermophysical properties may be tuned by modifying the cation composition of a given HEO. Many material applications demand a highly specific set of properties. For example, thermal barrier coatings require thermal expansion coefficient matching with a metal surface, high-temperature phase stability, low thermal conductivity, and chemical inertness, among other properties. Due to their innate tunability, HEOs have been proposed as candidates for advanced material applications such as thermal barrier coatings.

Terminology 
The definition of high-entropy oxide is debated. In oxide literature, the term is commonly used to refer to any oxide with at least five principal cations. However, it has been suggested that this is a misnomer, as most reports neglect to calculate configurational entropy. Additionally, a survey of 10 HEOs found that only 3 were entropy-stabilized. It has been suggested that the term HEO be replaced with three terms: compositionally complex oxide, high-entropy oxide, and entropy-stabilized oxide. In this scheme, compositionally complex refers to materials with multiple elements occupying the same sublattice, high-entropy refers to materials where configurational entropy plays a role in stabilization, and entropy-stabilized refers to materials where entropy dominates the enthalpy term and is necessary for the formation of a crystalline phase.

See Also 

 High-entropy alloy

References 

Oxides